Gillingham return to League One for the 2009–10 season after being promoted from League Two the previous season.

Season review

Kit
Vandanel continues as Gillingham's kit designer and KRBS.com stays as their main shirt sponsor.

Events
 9 Sep 2009: Michael Anderson is appointed as director.
 19 Nov 2009: Alan Julian is transfer listed.
 14 Dec 2009: Simon Royce is injured in car crash and will be out for at least four weeks.

League
Gillingham began their League One campaign with a 5–0 win over Swindon Town, with Simeon Jackson getting the first League One hat-trick of the season. This was followed by a 4–2 loss against Tranmere Rovers and another two losses followed against Colchester United and Hartlepool United, moving the Gills into the relegation zone.

The Gills were held to a draw at Walsall, they then beat Exeter City and then a win over Millwall. Leeds United defeated Gillingham 4–1, followed closely by a draw against Norwich City and then another 4–1 loss to Southampton, conceding 9 and scoring only 3 in three games.

They bounced back quickly with a 3–2 win over Wycombe Wanderers. Two loses followed against Brighton & Hove Albion and MK Dons. The Gills then held another side, who was relegated for the Championship, Charlton Athletic, to a draw. Southend United then beat Gillingham 1–0.

The Gills continue their rollercoaster season with a 1–0 win over Oldham Athletic and then a loss to Bristol Rovers. Three days later Simeon Jackson put an early penalty away to beat Yeovil Town. Leyton Orient then beat Gillingham 3–1 and Carlisle United held the Gills to a goalless draws. Promotion chaser Huddersfield Town beat Gillingham 2–1. The nearly postponed game against Stockport County showed three stunning goals from Oli, on loan Brandy and Nutter, the second time the fans cleared out the snow it did not turn out so well as the Gills lost to Brentford, this was then followed by a scrappy draw against Exeter City.

Gillingham start the new year with a 3–1 loss to Swindon Town, followed by a goalless draw against Colchester United and then another draw against Hartlepool United. Walsall held Gillingham to a third consecutive draw. This undefeated streak ended with a 4–0 loss to Brentofrd and then a loss to Tranmere Rovers. A draw to Yeovil Town then followed, Bristol Rovers lost to Gillingham 1–0 but Leyton Orient held the Gills to a 1–1 draw. Carlisle United ended Gillingham's three-game unbeaten streak with a 2–0 win before quickly bouncing back and beating Huddersfield Town. Stockport County then drew with them, another draw with Charlton Athletic followed. MK Dons drew to Gillingham, to make the Gills third consecutive draw. Fellow relegation battlers Brighton & Hove Albion held Gillingham to a 1–1 draw. Gillingham beat an on form promotion hopefuls Leeds United.

Gillingham's four game unbeaten run was ended by fellow strugglers Oldham Athletic. Oli, Howe and Barcham gave Gillingham a 3–0 over Southend United. But losing the next game to Millwall.

Pld = Matches played; W = Matches won; D = Matches drawn; L = Matches lost; F = Goals for; A = Goals against; GD = Goal difference; Pts = Points

Results summary

Cups

FA Cup
In the first round of the cup the Gills beat Southend United 3–0. Gillingham then beat League Two outfit, Burton Albion to go through to the third round. The Gills travels to Accrington Stanley for the fourth round. The third-round game was postponed due to heavy snow in Lancashire, meaning both clubs would be put in the draw for the 4th round. Gillingham were knocked out by Accrington after the third attempt of playing the game.

League Cup
Gillingham's first opponents in the Cup was Championship outfit Plymouth Argyle. The Gills beat the Pilgrims 2–1 to qualify for the next round. The second round Gillingham lost to Premier League side Blackburn Rovers.

Football League Trophy
Gillingham beat Colchester United in the first round. Then two weeks after playing Norwich City in the league, the Gills took them of in the FLT and were knocked out by the Canaries.

Squad

Statistics
Last Update 3 April 2010

|}

 *Indicates player left during the season

Transfers

Summer transfers in

Summer transfers out

 * Indicates the player joined club after being released

Loans In

Notes

Loan out

Winter Transfers In

Fixtures & results

League

FA Cup

League Cup

Football League Trophy

See also
 Gillingham F.C. seasons

References

Gillingham F.C. seasons
Gillingham